Altuğ Çelikbilek (born 7 September 1996) is a Turkish professional tennis player.

Çelikbilek has a career high ATP singles ranking of World No. 154 achieved on 21 February 2022. He also has a career high ATP doubles ranking of World No. 224, achieved on 25 July 2022. Çelikbilek has won 2 ATP Challengers and 5 ITF singles titles and 11 ITF doubles titles. He is currently the No. 1 Turkish player.

Professional career
He made his Grand Slam debut at the 2021 French Open as a qualifier.
 
Çelikbilek has represented Turkey at Davis Cup, where he has a win–loss record of 5–7.

ATP Challenger and ITF Futures finals

Singles: 11 (8–3)

Doubles: 27 (12–15)

References

External links 
 
 
 

1996 births
Living people
Turkish male tennis players
Sportspeople from Antalya
Sportspeople from Istanbul
Competitors at the 2018 Mediterranean Games
Mediterranean Games competitors for Turkey
21st-century Turkish people